Yusuf al-Khal (December 25, 1917 – March 9, 1987) was a Lebanese-Syrian poet, journalist, and publisher. He is considered the greatest exponent of prose poetry (qaṣīdat al-natr) as well one of the pioneers of Arabic surrealist poetry.

With fellow poets Adonis and Ounsi el-Hajj, al-Khal founded the magazine Shi'r ("Poetry") in Beirut in 1957, initiating a movement to modernize Arabic literature. His poetry has also been recognized in Near East poetry collections. He published many volumes of avant-garde poetry and translated Whitman, Eliot, Frost, and others.

Al-Khal was the son of a Lebanese Protestant minister and was Greek Orthodox. He was raised in Tripoli, Lebanon and made his career largely in Lebanon.

Between 1944 and 1948 al-Khal taught at the American University in Beirut, where he had previously studied under Charles Malik and did his bachelor's degree in philosophy and English literature. He established the Dar al-Kitab in Beirut, and this house started its activities by publishing the magazine “Sawt a Woman”, which was edited by al-Khal, in addition to managing the house until 1948.

From 1948 to 1955 al-Khal lived in the USA, where he worked for the United Nations as a journalist in the press and publishing department. He returned to Lebanon in 1955.

Al-Khal created the quarterly poetry magazine Shi'r that was published between 1957 and 1964. Then it resumed in the first of 1967. Its entire collection was reprinted in 11 volumes. In 1967, An-Nahar Publishing House was established, and he joined it as Editor-in-Chief. He established (1957-1959) a remarkable literary salon, the Salon of Poetry Magazine, known as the Salon of Thursday. The members of the salon included the poets Yusuf Al-Khal, Adonis, Shawqi Abi Chakra and Fouad Rebekah.

Personal life 
Al-Khal married Lebanese-American painter Helen Khal with whom he had sons Tarek and Jawad. He married for a second time to the Syrian artist Maha Bayrakdar in 1970. Maha was a well-known painter in Damascus and she worked for several years in Lebanese media. They had two children Yusuf and Ward, who later became popular TV stars in Lebanon.

Selection of works

His own works 

 Al-ḥurriyya ( Freedom ). 1944.
 Hīrūdia. Play. 1954.
 Al-biʾr al-mahǧūra (The dried up well). 1958.
 Qasāʾid fī l-arbaʿīn. 1960.
 Al-aʿmāl aš-šiʿriyya al-kāmila (1938–1968) (Poetic Complete Works). 1973.
 Rasāʾil ilā Dūn Kishūt (Letters to Don Quixote). 1979.
 Al-wilādat ath-thāniya (The rebirth). 1981.
 Al-hadātha fī š-šiʿr (The youth / novelty in the lyric). 1978.
 Dafātir al-ayyām (diaries). 1987.

Translations 

 Khalil Gibran : The Prophet. 1968.
 TS Eliot : The Destroyed Earth. 1958
 Anthology of American Poems. 1958.
 Carl Sandburg : Abraham Lincoln. 1959.
 Robert Frost : Selected Poems. 1962.
 The new Testament. 1958.

Yusuf al-Khal translated in German 
Some of his poems have appeared in collections in German, e. B. in

 Suleman Taufiq (Ed.): New Arabic Poetry. Munich 2004, ISBN 3-423-13262-0 .

Featured works 
 al-Khal, Yusuf. The Flag of Childhood: Poems from The Middle East. “The Deserted Well” Ed. Naomi Shihab Nye. New York: Aladdin, 1998.  76.

References

External links

1917 births
1987 deaths
20th-century Lebanese poets
Syrian people of Lebanese descent
Syrian emigrants to Lebanon
Syrian magazine founders
Greek Orthodox Christians from Syria